Upper Little River is a  long 5th order tributary to the Cape Fear River in Harnett County, North Carolina.

Course
Upper Little River rises in a pond about 1 mile east of Lemon Springs, North Carolina in Lee County and then follows an easterly course into Harnett County to join the Cape Fear River about 0.5 miles northwest of Erwin, North Carolina.

Watershed
Upper Little River drains  of area, receives about 46.9 in/year of precipitation, has a wetness index of 426.47 and is about 48% forested.

See also
List of rivers of North Carolina

References

Rivers of North Carolina
Rivers of Harnett County, North Carolina
Rivers of Lee County, North Carolina
Tributaries of the Cape Fear River